Janette Husárová (born 4 June 1974) is a Slovak former tennis player.

On 13 January 2003, she reached her best singles ranking of world No. 31. On 21 April 2003, she peaked at No. 3 in the doubles rankings.

She won the WTA Tour Championships women's doubles title in 2002, partnering with Elena Dementieva. With Dementieva, she reached the final of US Open doubles competition in the same year, losing to Virginia Ruano Pascual and Paola Suárez.

Playing for Slovakia Fed Cup team, Husárová has a win–loss record of 17–12.
Together with Daniela Hantuchová, she was a member of the Slovak team winning the Fed Cup in 2002.

In her career, Husárová won 25 doubles titles on the WTA Tour, including the season-ending WTA Championships and three Tier I tournaments (Berlin, Moscow (2002) and Tokyo (2005)), as well as four singles and 16 doubles titles on the ITF Circuit.

In February 2016, Husárová announced her retirement from professional tennis.

Significant finals

Grand Slam tournaments

Doubles: 1 (runner-up)

WTA Championships

Doubles: 1 (title)

WTA Tour career finals

Doubles: 43 (25 titles, 18 runner-ups)

ITF Circuit finals

Singles: 11 (4–7)

Doubles: 27 (16–11)

Grand Slam performance timelines

Singles

Doubles

References

External links

 
 
 
 
 
 

1974 births
Living people
Tennis players from Bratislava
Slovak female tennis players
Olympic tennis players of Slovakia
Tennis players at the 2004 Summer Olympics
Tennis players at the 2008 Summer Olympics
Czechoslovak female tennis players